Navarone Island is a fictional island portrayed in a novel by Alistair MacLean entitled The Guns of Navarone.  The novel was made into a movie, but the film changed some of the geography of the island.  Although Navarone does not exist, its history is based on the real history of the Aegean Islands of Greece.

Setting and terrain

MacLean not only invented the island of Navarone, but he also created a whole setting for it in the eastern Aegean.  In the novel, Navarone forms part of the Sporades Islands group.  Four miles to the east of Navarone's main town lies mainland Turkey.  North of the island, the Turkish coast juts out into a sharp promontory, the fictional Cape Demirci.  The promontory is rimmed with rock but dimpled with coves of white sand beaches.  Beyond the coast rise the towering Anatolian mountains.  About sixteen miles north of the cape, according to the book, is the island of Kheros, which features importantly in the novel.  To the west is the fictional Lerades group of islands, which stretches in a northwesterly direction for 60 miles.  The closest of the Lerades is Maidos, six miles from Navarone.  At one point in the book, a character on Navarone spots whitewashed fishermen's villages on Maidos.  To the south is the Dodecanese group. 

Although Kheros, Maidos, and the Lerades are invented, the Sporades and Dodecanese islands are real.  The Guns of Navarone thus provides both a fictional setting for its plot and frames this setting within the real world of the Aegean.

MacLean implies that Navarone Island measures roughly 100 square miles.  He describes a variety of terrain, from low-lying areas where carob tree groves thrive to snow-capped mountains.  Virtually the entire coast is ringed with cliffs.  This is particularly true in the south of the island.  One character in the novel asserts: “The entire south coast of Navarone . . . consists of one vast, impossible precipice.”  At its highest point, the southern cliff is one quarter of a mile long and rises to a height of 400 feet.  At the top of this cliff is a narrow, bare strip of ground, and then a fifty-yard-wide jumble of large boulders.  The top of the cliff is accessible by a path, but the soil is soft, crumbling, and treacherous.  At the base of the cliff, fifteen to twenty yards out in the water is a reef, “gap-toothed and needle-pointed.”

The fictional southern cliffs of Navarone are reminiscent of the real cliffs of the island of Thira, or Santorini.  Thira's tall cliffs of lava, ash, pumice, and slag are part of the remains of an ancient volcano.

Above the southern cliffs rise the mountains of Navarone.  Their slopes are steep and wind-swept, covered in scree and scattered with boulders and shallow depressions.  A few huts for shepherds and goatherds are the only habitations.  Characters in the novel see their “grim, jagged” peaks from at least fifty miles away.  The highest mountain is Mount Kostos.  When the novel places characters on its slopes, snowfall is heavy and continuous, impressing one character as being more than in the White Mountains of Crete.  Southern Navarone is honeycombed with caves, some of piled volcanic slabs.

The comparison in the novel to mountains on the island of Crete seems apt.  The Lefka Ori, or White Mountains, are snow-capped in winter, and exhibit many stretches of scree, or loose stones.  Isolated shepherd and goatherd huts can be seen among the heights.

Towns and villages

As described by MacLean, much of Navarone is taken up by fields or wasteland, but several towns and villages also dot the island. The largest, of around 5,000 people, is the town of Navarone on the north coast. The town lies on an almost circular, volcanic bay with a narrow entrance to the northwest.  In the novel, the harbor contains both a fleet of caïques and several German tenders. To the west of the harbor, the terrain slopes up gently to a series of olive groves, and the dusty streets run down to the water. In the south, the streets run parallel to the water down to the old town, the ground rising more sharply to the south. Dominating the town are a line of cliffs one hundred and fifty feet above the harbor, and a large fortress, its walls built of large blocks of masonry pierced by narrow embrasures. The central plot of the novel, a British raid on the German garrison in 1943, leads to the destruction of much of the fortification. A particular feature of the fortress is a massive mound of volcanic rock towering over the walls and a large cave with a heavy overhang jutting out over the harbor. There is a sheer, 120-foot drop from the mouth of the cave to the surface of the water.

In the outskirts of Navarone town, the novel describes high-walled terraced market gardens, a decaying Byzantine church, and a whitewashed Orthodox Christian monastery. In the lower town, one finds narrow, winding, and dimly-lit streets, only inches wider than a car, hugely cobbled, with almost knee high pavements.  In one scene, MacLean describes a highly ornamented latticework grille protecting the outside landing at top of a set of white stairs. The main square abuts the southern side of the old fortress.  Houses on the west side of the square are flat-roofed (to catch winter rains), and are fairly modern, built of whitewashed stone and Parian granite. The east side of the square, in contrast, mostly has antiquated timber and turf houses similar to those found in remote mountain villages.

As with other details in the novel, MacLean models Navarone town on real Greek towns. For example, visitors to Thera can see a small monastery and the Orthodox cathedral of Panagia Ypapanti.

The novel describes a tavern in Navarone as having walls, tables, chairs, and shelves painted a bright (MacLean calls it garish) blue. Advertisements for Fix beer, a real product, adorn the walls. The novel claims that wine shops are painted red, and sweetmeat shops green.

About three miles south of Navarone town, according to the novel, lies the village of Margaritha. It is located in a fold of hills near the mouth of an almost perfectly symmetrical valley that extends about four miles to the mountains in the south. It is small, with flat-roofed houses, and lies on the bank of a little stream that winds through the valley. The village square is shaded by plane trees. Olive groves lie to the south of the village.

At one point in The Guns of Navarone, characters shelter in a notable terrain feature between Margaritha and Navarone called “the Devil’s Playground.”  It is a region of “gaunt, shattered” cliffs that rise steeply above the stunted, gnarled carob trees in the plain. Rock-strewn ravines cleave through the cliffs and wind aimlessly into the interior of the Playground or come abruptly to dead ends.  The area is riddled with caves, leading some people to call it “Little Cyprus”.

The real island of Cyprus is indeed known for its caves, both those on land and along the seashore.

Early history

The Guns of Navarone focuses on World War II, and provides only limited information about the early history of Navarone.  The novel describes the castle at Vygos, 2 miles on the coast road to the east of Navarone town, and ascribes its construction to the Franks.  The castle is small, essentially a manor house built around crenellated towers. 

In reality, the islands of the eastern Aegean have had many masters.  The Persian Empire, the empire of Alexander the Great, the Romans, the Byzantines, the Franks, the Venetians, and the Ottoman Empire have each ruled for a time and then departed before modern Greece claimed the islands. The period of Greek history known as "The Frankokratia", when a number of primarily French and Italian states were established on the territory of the dissolved Byzantine Empire, did leave behind a number of impressive castles in various part of Greece.  

MacLean states that, for several generations, the island has been owned by the Vlachos family.  The head of the family in the novel, Eugene Vlachos, is also a consul and a senior official of the Greek government.

Axis occupation in World War II

The Guns of Navarone is mainly about a daring Allied raid in 1943 that causes significant damage to the German installations on the island.

In actuality, Nazi Germany conquered the Kingdom of Greece in April 1941.  As part of the campaign, the German 164th Division launched amphibious landings on Greek islands in the Aegean.  

The novel reflects this campaign, with German forces occupying nearly all of the Sporades, including Navarone.  The British spirit Eugene Vlachos out of Navarone to Egypt ahead of the German advance, to avoid reprisals against him.  One Vlachos retainer, Eugene's steward Louki, remains loyal to the family and aids the Allied raiders.  Life is not easy for the inhabitants of occupied Navarone.  Many abandon their homes in Navarone town for Margaritha and other outlying villages.  The sight of Germans occupying the fortress is particularly galling to those who live on the main square near the walls.  The novel notes that German officers have moved into many of the empty houses on west side of the square.

British and German moves, 1943

The Guns of Navarone describes how, in the late summer and early fall of 1943, the United Kingdom sends missions to many of the Aegean islands.  Much of the British effort is led by elements of the Long Range Desert Group and the Special Boat Service (SBS).   By September, British troops hold most of the big islands, with some garrisons at or above battalion strength.  However, the British bypass Navarone as too strongly held by the Germans.  According to one character, Navarone has the reputation of being “a grim, impregnable iron fortress.”

In the novel, the Germans refuse to accept the British occupation of the islands.  The Sporades have little strategic importance.  However, neutral Turkey is close by, and Germany cannot afford to appear weak in the eyes of the Turks.  Elite German parachutists and mountain troops attack the British garrisons, as German dive bombers harry the enemy -- the German hold absolute air supremacy in the Aegean.  The British lose over 10,000 men during the onslaught.  The Germans retake every island, with one exception.  A British garrison of 1,200 men still holds out on Kheros.  In November, near Athens, the Germans assemble an invasion fleet of caïques and E-Boats for the capture of Kheros.  German air units, based on Samos, will support the fleet.  MacLean mixes fact with fiction by referring to the fictional island of Kheros and the real island of Samos and the real city of Athens.

This aspect of the novel closely resembles the real campaign in the Dodecanese.  The British did indeed try to wrest control of the islands from the Germans in 1943.  The campaign included several elements mentioned in the novel, such as the British use of the SBS and the German use of paratroops and dive bombers.  At the height of the campaign, a German invasion force fought and won a pitched battle for the British-held island of Leros.

MacLean uses his fictional version of the eastern Aegean to establish a premise of the novel, that the men on Kheros can be relieved only by going past Navarone.  In order to save the Kheros garrison, the British Royal Navy organizes a squadron to steam north to Kheros.  The ships have to reach the island and get back to base in a single night in order to avoid German air attack.  As transport ships and tenders are too slow, the British can only use destroyers.  Moving through the Lerades would be too dangerous because the Germans had mined the narrow passages, and going around the northern tip of the island group would take too much time.  Hugging the Turkish coast would endanger diplomatic relations with Turkey.  Because of these considerations, the British squadron can only take one passage, the clear channel between Maidos and Navarone.

The guns of Navarone

However, the Germans had taken steps to ensure that such a move would be virtually suicidal.  In the fortress cave overlooking the town of Navarone, they install two powerful artillery pieces.  These are the “guns of Navarone,” the object of the raid that drives the plot of the novel.  One character who sees them estimates that they are at least 12 inch guns.  This artillery is radar-controlled, with the aid of two large scanners atop the fortress.  The Germans enlarge the cave by blasting out volcanic rock from the rear of the formation.  They install turntables for the guns and lift shafts for hoisting shells.  In the fortress -- the walls of which they topped with spikes and barbed wire -- they build barrack blocks, a powerhouse, an ordnance depot, a garage, a water storage tank, magazines, senior officers quarters, and a ferro-concrete control tower for the guns.  Twin rows of anti-aircraft guns protect the main battery.  Searchlights and mortar and machine gun emplacements dominate each side of the harbor mouth.  The heavy artillery battery dominates the Maidos channel.  When the British 8-inch cruiser Sybaris tries to run the gauntlet in July, she is quickly sunk.

In addition to the installations in Navarone town, the novel has the Germans spread troops and set up checkpoints throughout the island.  They maintain roadblocks on Navarone's only two roads. An important garrison holds Margaritha.  The German compound includes a hut for the enlisted  men and separate quarters for officers, and is surrounded by a barbed wire fence ten feet high.  A guard post covers the head of the valley north of Margaritha.

Allied attacks on the guns

The novel lists several British efforts to neutralize the guns.  In September, commandos, including some from the Royal Marines, and SBS troops launch a large scale amphibious attack on Navarone.  They are massacred.  Twice in late October and early November, SBS teams parachute into the island.  They are never heard from again. The Royal Air Force sends a squadron of Consolidated B-24 Liberator bombers to attack the guns, but the cave overhang thwarts the attempt.

These failures set the scene for the final attempt that is the subject of The Guns of Navarone.  In November 1943, a small Allied unit of saboteurs launches a last-ditch attack on the guns, only a short time ahead of the German invasion of Kheros.  Landing on the south coast, the Allied troops scale the high cliff, make their way to Navarone town, and demolish the German heavy guns with explosives.  The coup leaves the way clear for the British naval squadron, led by the modern S-class destroyer H.M.S. Sirdar, to steam north and rescue the garrison on Kheros.

After The Guns of Navarone
Navarone does not appear in, but is mentioned by name in the titles of, Force 10 from Navarone and its film adaptation; it likewise does not appear in MacLean's novelization of the film Partisans.

The 1961 parody "The Guns of Abalone" on The Rocky and Bullwinkle Show supposes that communist forces (Pottsylvanian spy Boris Badenov) took over the island, here with the thinly veiled pun name of "Abalone," and reactivated the cannons, and that the original team that had shut down the guns in 1943 randomly recruited Bullwinkle J. Moose to shut them back down.

Notes

References
Blau, George E.  The German Campaign in the Balkans (Spring 1941).  Washington, D.C.: Center for Military History, United States Army, 1984.
Haywood, John.  Atlas of World History.  Abingdon: Andromeda Oxford Ltd., 1997.
MacLean, Alistair.  The Guns of Navarone.  Greenwich: Fawcett Publications, 1957.
MacLean, Alistair.  The Guns of Navarone.  New York: Sterling Publishing, 2011.
Rietveld, Gordon F., Jane Rietveld, Greece, Aegean Island Guide.  Englewood Cliffs: Prentice-Hall, 1982.
Rogers, Anthony.  Churchill’s Folly: Leros and the Aegean, The Last Great British Defeat of World War Two.  London: Cassel, 2003.
The Guns of Navarone. directed by J. Lee Thompson.  Culver City: Columbia Pictures, 1961.

Fictional islands
Fictional locations in Europe
Greece in fiction
Mediterranean Sea in fiction